is a 1949 Japanese film directed by Akira Kurosawa.

Plot
The film centers on Dr. Kyoji Fujisaki, a young, idealistic doctor who, during his service as an army physician during World War II, contracted syphilis from the blood of a patient when he accidentally cut himself during an operation.

Contaminated with this infectious, typically shameful, and then-virtually incurable disease, Fujisaki returns home from the war to the clinic presided over by his obstetrician father, Dr. Konosuke Fujisaki. He comes into contact with the patient who contaminated him, in the process seeing the consequences of ignoring the disease. Treating himself in secret with Salvarsan and tormented by his sense of injustice for not being able to help the man, he rejects Misao, his fiancé of six years, without explanation, as he does not wish her to have to wait for a number of years until he is cured. Heartbroken, Misao becomes engaged to another man. She makes one last plea to Fujisaki, but he stands firm in rejecting her.

Cast
 Toshiro Mifune as Dr. Kyoji Fujisaki
  as Misao Matsumoto
 Takashi Shimura as Dr. Konosuke Fujisaki
  as Susumu Nakada
  as Patrolman Nosaka
 Noriko Sengoku as apprentice nurse Rui Minegishi
 Chieko Nakakita as Takiko Nakada 
  as the dealer
 Masateru Sasaki as the old soldier
 Seiji Izumi as the policeman
 Tadashi Date as the father of the boy with appendicitis
 Shigeyuki Miyajima as the officer

Production
Production was interrupted due to a lengthy strike at the Toho movie studio, and Kurosawa would ultimately finish the movie at rival studio Daiei. At that time Daiei also owned a baseball team, the Daiei Stars, whose players visited the movie set during filming.

Home video
The Quiet Duel was released on DVD in the U.S. by BCI Eclipse, as the first title in their "Director's Series". It was never released in U.K. cinemas, but was released on DVD in the U.K. in 2006 under the title "The Silent Duel".

References

External links
 
1983 Review of film at New York Times
The Quiet Duel at Akira Kurosawa Info
Review of film at Hackwriters

1949 films
1949 drama films
Japanese drama films
Japanese black-and-white films
Films about syphilis
Medical-themed films
Daiei Film films
Films directed by Akira Kurosawa
Films produced by Sōjirō Motoki
Films with screenplays by Akira Kurosawa
Films with screenplays by Senkichi Taniguchi
Films scored by Akira Ifukube
1940s pregnancy films
Japanese pregnancy films